An inhibitor cystine knot (aka ICK or Knottin) is a protein structural motif containing three disulfide bridges. Knottins are one of three folds in the cystine knot motif; the other closely related knots are the Growth Factor Cystine Knot (GFCK) and the Cyclic Cystine Knot (CCK; cyclotide).  Types include a) cyclic mobius, b) cyclic bracelet, c) acyclic inhibitor knottins. Cystine knot motifs are found frequently in nature in a plethora of plants, animals, and fungi and serve diverse functions from appetite suppression to anti-fungal activity.

Along with the sections of polypeptide between them, two disulfides form a loop through which the third disulfide bond (linking the 3rd and 6th cysteine in the sequence) passes, forming a knot. The motif is common in invertebrate toxins such as those from arachnids and molluscs. The motif is also found in some inhibitor proteins found in plants, but the plant and animal motifs are thought to be a product of convergent evolution. The ICK motif is a very stable protein structure which is resistant to heat denaturation and proteolysis.
CK peptide components of venoms target voltage-gated ion channels but members of the family also act as antibacterial and haemolytic agents. Plant ICK proteins are often protease inhibitors.

Knottins have high stability to pH, heat, and enzymes. Because of their stability and their favorable pharmacodynamic properties, knottins are becoming increasingly popular as protein engineering scaffolds. Moreover, engineered knottins have shown significant promise as therapeutics, imaging agents, and targeting agents for chemotherapy.

The mammalian proteins Agouti signalling peptide and Agouti related peptide are the only known mammalian examples of this motif. Both are neuropeptides involved in cell signalling. The former is responsible for hair (fur) colouration.

The motif is similar to the cyclic cystine knot or cyclotide, but lacks the cyclisation of the polypeptide backbone which is present in the latter family. The growth factor cystine knot (GFCK) shares the motif but its topology is such that it is the bond between the first and fourth disulfide which threads through the loop.

Proteins which contain the ICK motif
Agouti related peptide
Agouti signalling peptide
Albumin I
Covalitoxin-II
DkTx
Grammotoxin
GsMTx-4
Guangxitoxin
Hainantoxin
Hanatoxin
Heteroscodratoxin-1
Huwentoxin
Maurocalcine
Theraphosa leblondi toxin
δ-Palutoxin
Phrixotoxin
Psalmotoxin
Robustoxin
Stromatoxin
Tachystatin
Vanillotoxin
Vejocalcin

References

External links
 The cyclotide webpage
The KNOTTIN Database

Protein structure
Neurotoxins
Ion channel toxins
Protein folds
Cysteine-rich proteins